A Bachelor of Pharmacy (abbreviated B Pharm or  PharmB or BS Pharm) is a graduate academic degree in the field of pharmacy. In many countries, this degree is a prerequisite for registration to practice as a pharmacist. Since both PharmB and PharmD are prerequisites to license in most western countries they're considered equivalent. In many western countries, the foreign graduates with BPharm, PharmB or BS Pharm practice similarly as PharmD graduates. It is analogous to MBBS vs. MD where MBBS is foreign equivalent of MD. It is training to understand the properties and impacts of medicines and developing the skills required to counsel patients about their use.

B Pharm holders can work in several fields such as being a pharmacist, patient counseling, doing further studies such as master's degree, working in a university as a lecturer, or working as a drug information specialist.

In some countries, it has been superseded by the Doctor of Pharmacy (PharmD) and Master of Pharmacy (MPharm) degrees. In the United States, this degree was granted as the baccalaureate pharmacy degree only at Washington State University, where it has now been superseded by the PharmD degree. The degree previously offered in the US—and the required degree in Canada—is the Bachelor of Science in Pharmacy.
In countries including Canada, UK, Australia and New Zealand, BPharm/BS Pharm/PharmB are prerequisite for practicing as a Pharmacist. These degrees are awarded per the British tradition and considered as foreign equivalents of PharmD.

Asia and Oceania

Australia
In Australia, the BPharm degree is awarded following a four-year undergraduate pharmacy program. Australian undergraduate pharmacy courses were previously three years but were increased to four years during the 1990s with an increased emphasis on pharmacy practice education. It is compulsory to undertake clinical placements during this undergraduate program. During the early 2000s, two-year postgraduate Master of Pharmacy courses were established by many universities, but to date these have accounted for a relatively minor proportion of pharmacy graduates. 

All BPharm programs in Australia are accredited by the New Zealand and Australian Pharmacy Schools Accreditation Committee (NAPSAC). Programs provide training in fields including pharmacology, chemistry, pharmaceutical chemistry, pharmacy practice (including pharmacotherapeutics, disease state management, etc.), pharmaceutics, ethics, pharmacy law, pharmacy management, physiology, anatomy, biochemistry, kinetics, and compounding medications.

At present, either the BPharm degree or the MPharm degree are acceptable for registration as a practicing pharmacist. See list of pharmacy schools: Australia for institutions offering the BPharm degree.

Bachelor of Pharmacy (Honours)
As with most honours degrees at Australian universities, the awarding of a Bachelor of Pharmacy (Honours) (abbreviated BPharm(Hons)) is based on the completion of original research and a high-level of academic performance. All other graduates are awarded a pass degree. Unlike most Honours degrees in Australia, an additional year of study is not required for a BPharm(Hons) as most universities integrate research and coursework in the fourth year of BPharm(Hons) programs.

Bachelor of Pharmacy (Rural)
In 2003, The University of Sydney began offering a four-year Bachelor of Pharmacy (Rural) (abbreviated BPharm (Rural)) program at its Orange campus. It was designed to address the continuing shortage of pharmacists in rural areas and placed greater emphasis on rural aspects of pharmacy practice. Since most of the units-of-study were common to both the BPharm and BPharm (Rural), many of the lectures were delivered by academics at the main campus in Sydney with a live video broadcast to students at Orange.

The program was not offered in 2005, following the transfer of Orange campus to Charles Sturt University. Following a review, a new BPharm (Rural) program was offered from 2006 onwards at the university's main campus (Camperdown/Darlington campus).

Although the rural program has not continued, there remains a focus on rural workforce within the degree to promote pharmacy student interest in pursuing a rural career.  Rural placements are encouraged in almost all undergraduate programs.

Universities
Australian universities offering Bachelor or Master of Pharmacy programs (circa June 2010):
 Charles Sturt University – Wagga Wagga and Orange, New South Wales
 Curtin University of Technology – Perth, Western Australia
 James Cook University – Townsville, Queensland
 La Trobe University – Bendigo, Victoria
 Monash University – Parkville, Victoria (formerly the Victorian College of Pharmacy)
 Queensland University of Technology – Brisbane, Australia
 University of Queensland – Brisbane, Queensland
 University of South Australia – Adelaide, South Australia
 University of Sydney – Sydney, New South Wales
 University of Tasmania – Hobart, Tasmania
 University of New England - Provisional Government Approval – Armidale, New South Wales
 Griffith University + MPharm for Registration – Gold Coast, Queensland
 University of Canberra + MPharm with Registration – Canberra, Australian Capital Territory
 University of Newcastle + MPharm with Registration – Newcastle, New South Wales

Hong Kong 
In Hong Kong, Bachelor of Pharmacy is offered by the Chinese University of Hong Kong (CUHK) under the Faculty of Medicine. The CUHK Bachelor of Pharmacy programme started in 1992 and had been the only pharmacy degree programme available in Hong Kong until 2009. It aims to train graduates to function independently as professional health care providers who, as part of the health care team, can provide first class pharmaceutical and health-related care for the health of Hong Kong citizens.

The Bachelor of Pharmacy (BPharm) degree is awarded on satisfactory completion of at least three/four years of full-time study. To be considered for registration by the Pharmacy and Poisons Board Hong Kong as practising pharmacist in Hong Kong, the student must complete a further year of pre-registration training as required by the Pharmacy and Poisons Board.

Starting from 2009, the University of Hong Kong (HKU) has also implemented the Bachelor of Pharmacy programme under the Li Ka Shing Faculty of Medicine.

CUHK offers 55 places while HKU offers 25 places in 2013.

India 
The Bachelor of Pharmacy degree is popularly known as B-Pharm in India. It is a four-year program with both annual and semester schemes available. To be eligible, one must pass with at least 50% marks in 10 + 2  (or an equivalent examination) with physics, chemistry, biology/ biotechnology/Maths as one of the subjects. Both PCB and PCM combinations are eligible. In some states, it is mandatory to give an additional pharmacy entrance examination to be eligible for the course, the entrance tests can be the state common entrance test or, the National Eligibility cum Entrance Test (Undergraduate)(NEET). D.Pharm. (Diploma of Pharmacy) holders are eligible for admission into B.Pharm.  second year directly via a lateral entry in India. B.Pharm. holders can directly join into the 4th year of Pharm.D (PG) course.

Colleges imparting pharmaceutical education (D.Pharm., B.Pharm., M.Pharm., Pharm D) must be approved by All Indian Council of Technical Education(AICTE) and the Pharmacy Council Of India(PCI).

For a student to be eligible for registration as a Pharmacist/ Clinical pharmacist in India, the college from which he or she graduated must be approved by the PCI. B.Pharm. is often superseded by M.Pharm., Pharm D (PB) and PhD-level courses although the minimum qualification required for registration as a pharmacist is D.Pharm.

Bangladesh 
The Bachelor of Pharmacy degree is popularly known as B.Pharm. (Honors) in Bangladesh. It is a four-year program with both annual and semester schemes available. In order to be eligible, one must pass with at least 50% marks in 10 + 2  (or an equivalent examination) with b

Colleges imparting pharmaceutical education (D.Pharm., B.Pharm., M.Pharm. and Pharm D) must be approved by the Pharmacy Council of Bangladesh (PCB)
.

For a student to be eligible for registration as a pharmacist in Bangladesh, the university from which he/she graduated must be approved by the PCB and have to follow the rules and regulations of PCB.

Prominent universities imparting B.Pharm. in Bangladesh approved by PCB are 
 Faculty of Pharmacy, University of Dhaka 
 Department of Pharmacy, BRAC University 
 Department of Pharmacy, Pabna University of Science & Technology 
 Department of Pharmacy, ASA University Bangladesh
 Department of Pharmacy, Gono Bishwabidyalay, 
 Department of Pharmacy, State University of Bangladesh 
 Department of Pharmacy, BGC Trust University Bangladesh 
 Department of Pharmacy, University Of Development Alternative (UODA) 
 Department of Pharmacy, Northern University Bangladesh.
 
and so on.

Pakistan

PharmD is the only basic pharmacy degree (5 years program) awarded by universities in Pakistan. The program is approved by the Pharmacy Council of Pakistan. Old 4 years BPharmacy (Bachelor of Pharmacy) degree holders who are registered as Pharmacists with the Pharmacy Councils of Punjab, Sindh, Balochistan and Khyber-Pakhtunkhwa can study at any university for a one-year evening and/or weekend condensed course leading to (post-B.Pharmacy) Doctor of Pharmacy which is approved by the Pharmacy Council of Pakistan.

Europe

Norway
In Norway, the Bachelor of Pharmacy degree is awarded by Oslo Metropolitan University, The University of Tromsø and Nord University. The degree makes one eligible to work as a pharmacist in Norway. Norway also offers the Master of Pharmacy degree, which often offers higher payment and more job opportunities than the Bachelor of Pharmacy degree.

Ireland
MPharm (Hons) degrees in the Republic of Ireland are offered by:
Trinity College, Dublin
University College Cork
Royal College of Surgeons in Ireland, Dublin

However, in Northern Ireland (which is part of the United Kingdom) MPharm degrees (as opposed to BSc or BPharm degrees) are offered at Queen's University Belfast as in the rest of the UK.

Finland
In Finland, pharmacy is taught in University of Helsinki, University of Eastern Finland and Åbo Akademi University. Bachelor of Pharmacy is called farmaseutti (dispenser) and Master of Pharmacy is called proviisori. Proviisori degree (MPharm) is required in order to be a pharmacist.

United Kingdom
In the United Kingdom, the BPharm degree was awarded following a three-year undergraduate pharmacy program. It was superseded in 1997 by the Master of Pharmacy (MPharm) degree, awarded following a four-year program, as a result of European Union harmonisation.

North America

Canada

The following Canadian universities offer the Bachelor of Pharmacy degree program:
 Dalhousie University
 University of Manitoba
 University of Saskatchewan

The following Canadian universities formerly offered the bachelor's degree program and replaced it with the undergraduate Doctor of Pharmacy:
 Memorial University of Newfoundland (last cohort of B.Sc. (Pharmacy) students graduated in 2020)
 Université de Montréal
 Université Laval
 University of Toronto
 University of Waterloo
 University of British Columbia
 University of Alberta

United States of America 
American universities do not offer Bachelor of Pharmacy programs, however many do offer pre-doctoral programs and other undergraduate degrees that better an applicants chance of becoming a student for a Doctor of Pharmacy degree.

South America

Guyana

The following universities in Guyana offer the Bachelor of Pharmacy degree program:

Texila American University

Africa

South Africa

South African universities that have BPharm programs:
Nelson Mandela University - Department of Pharmacy
North-West University (Potchefstroom Campus) - School of Pharmacy
Rhodes University - School of Pharmaceutical Sciences
University of KwaZulu-Natal (Westville Campus) - School of Pharmacy
University of Limpopo (Medunsa Campus) in collaboration with Tshwane University of Technology - School of Pharmacy
University of Limpopo (Turfloop Campus) - School of Pharmacy
University of the Western Cape - School of Pharmacy
University of the Witwatersrand - Department of Pharmacy

Lesotho
The following universities have BPharm programs in Lesotho:

National University of Lesotho - Department of Pharmacy

Kenya

The following Kenyan universities offer BPharm programs:

 University of Nairobi - School of Pharmacy, KNH Campus
 Mount Kenya University
 Kenyatta University
 Jomo Kenyatta University of Agriculture and Technology
 Kenya Methodist University
 United States International University Africa
Kabarak University

Uganda

The following Ugandan universities offer BPharm programs:
Mbarara University of Science and Technology
 Makerere University School of Health Sciences
 Kampala International University School of Health Sciences

See also
Doctor of Pharmacy
Master of Pharmacy
Pharmacist
Pharmaconomist
List of pharmacy schools
Australia Licensure

References

External links 

Pharmacy, Bachelor of
Pharmacy education